Liberazione is Italian for liberation.  It may refer to:

 Liberation Day (Italy), April 25, the anniversary of the 1945 fall of Mussolini's Italian Social Republic; a public holiday in Italy
 The Italian resistance movement's "War of Liberation" or "War of Resistance" during World War II in general
 Liberazione (newspaper), a newspaper maintained by the Partito della Rifondazione Comunista (Communist Refoundation Party), a splinter faction of the Italian Communist Party

See also
 Liberation (disambiguation)
 End of World War II in Europe
 Liberation Day in other countries